Puthiya Tamilagam is a caste political party based in Tamil Nadu, India.

Elections
The PT contested the 1999 Lok Sabha elections and ten seats in the 2001 state assembly elections, the latter in alliance with the DMK. It won no seats in either case.

In the 2009 elections to the Lok Sabha, K. Krishnasamy secured 1,16,685 votes in Tenkasi, while the victory margin was 35,324 votes.

For the 2011 state elections, it allied with the All India Anna Dravida Munnetra Kazhagam party and won two seats: K. Krishnasamy secured 71,330 votes in Ottapidaram constituency and A. Ramaswamy secured 75,124 votes in Nilakkottai constituency.

The 2014 Lok Sabha elections saw PT join with the DMK as part of the Democratic Progressive Alliance. It contested just the Tenkasi constituency, where Krishnasamy lost by 161,774 votes to the AIADMK candidate, M. Vansanthi.

The PT allied with the DMK for the 2016 state assembly elections and contested the seats of Ottapidaram, Srivilliputhur, Krishnarajapuram and Vasudevanallur. Krishnasamy lost to Sundarraj of the AIADMK by 493 votes in Ottapidaram.

2019 Lok Sabha election Puthiya Tamilagam party joined the AIADMK-BJP-PMK alliance in Tamil Nadu as part of the National Democratic Alliance. PT was allocated one constituency to contest, with Krishnasamy standing in Tenkasi  for the sixth time.

References

External links
 Official Website of Puthiya Thamilagam Party

Political parties established in 1996
Political parties in Tamil Nadu
1996 establishments in Tamil Nadu